Josif Rajačić (20 July 1785 – 1 December 1861), also known as Josif Rajačić-Brinski, was a metropolitan of Sremski Karlovci, Serbian Patriarch, administrator of Vojvodina, and baron.

Life
Rajačić was born in Lučani, a former village near Brinje in Lika (then Habsburg monarchy, today Croatia). He studied in Zagreb, Karlovci, Szeged and Vienna before dropping out to join the army in 1809 during the War of the Fifth Coalition. On 10 April 1810, he became a monk of the Serbian Orthodox Church in Gomirje Monastery.

On 24 June 1829 he became the Eparch of Dalmatia. On 5 July 1833, he became the Eparch of Vršac. In August 1842, he was named the Metropolitan of Karlovci.

At the May Assembly of Serbs in Sremski Karlovci in 1848, from the balcony of the Sremski Karlovci town hall, he was appointed Patriarch of the Serbs, while Stevan Šupljikac was chosen as the first Duke (Voivode) of Serbian Vojvodina. Apart from being a spiritual leader, Rajačić shared political and military leadership of Serbs at the time of war.
 
He became administrator of Serbian Vojvodina, and was head of the new Serb government (praviteljstvo) of Vojvodina. Rajačić formed an alliance with the House of Habsburg after being promised autonomy for opposing the 1848 Hungarian Revolution. After the Hungarians were defeated, Rajačić was nominated civil commissioner of Vojvodina by the Austrian Empire.

Rajačić assisted the educational development of the Serb people in the Austrian Empire. In the time when he was metropolitan of Sremski Karlovci, many new Serbian schools were opened. He opened the Patriarchal Library and Print Works. Rajačić spent much of his energy attempting to bring Vojvodina under Serbian administration. On 5 June 1848, on the day of Josip Jelačić's inauguration as Ban of Croatia, Jelačić was appointed Ban in the Patriarch's presence due to Juraj Haulik's current absence from Zagreb.

He was decorated Order of Leopold and Order of the Iron Crown of the first class.

See also
 Metropolitanate of Karlovci
 Vojvodina
 Rulers of Vojvodina
 History of Vojvodina
 History of Serbia
 Serbian Orthodox Church

References

Sources
 

1785 births
1861 deaths
People from Brinje
Serbs of Croatia
19th-century Serbian people
19th-century Eastern Orthodox bishops
People of Serbian Vojvodina
Josif I
History of Syrmia
People of the Revolutions of 1848
Metropolitans of Karlovci
Austrian Empire military personnel of the Napoleonic Wars
Habsburg Serbs
Serbia under Habsburg rule
Eparchy of Dalmatia
Serbian Orthodox Church in Croatia
Burials at Serbian Orthodox monasteries and churches